Showboat Branson Belle is a riverboat—more specifically, a showboat—on Table Rock Lake near Branson, Missouri. The lake is landlocked by the Table Rock Dam on one side and the Beaver Lake Dam on the other side. Being a showboat, it hosts lunch and dinner shows throughout the year.

Construction and launch  

The boat was constructed at its port at White River Landing and was launched on August 12, 1994. The bananas were used for lubrication because they were biodegradable and would not have polluted Table Rock Lake as grease would have. The boat is claimed by its owner to be the largest ship on a landlocked lake in the United States.

Incidents

On December 11, 2010, due to high winds that had come up suddenly, the Showboat Branson Belle ran aground while cruising on Table Rock Lake. The incident stranded 567 passengers and 76 crew members overnight.

References

External links

Showboat Branson Belle's Homepage 
Herschend Family Entertainment Corporation 

1994 ships
Maritime incidents in 2010
Missouri-related ships
Passenger ships of the United States
Riverboats
Tourist attractions in Stone County, Missouri
Tourist attractions in Taney County, Missouri
Herschend Family Entertainment
Branson, Missouri